Dario Šimić (born 12 November 1975) is a Croatian former footballer. Šimić was a versatile defender who played as full-back, sweeper or centre back; a physical and hard-tackling defender, he was known in particular for his strength and ability in the air. A product of Dinamo Zagreb Academy, he later played for Serie A sides Inter Milan and A.C. Milan and Ligue 1 side Monaco, before returning to Dinamo Zagreb in 2010, where he retired from the game during the same year.

Šimić played for Croatia national football team between 1996 and 2008. He retired from international football shortly after becoming the first Croatian player to win 100 international caps. He is currently the team's eighth most capped player. He was a member of Croatia's squad for each of the six major tournaments for which the team qualified during the 1990s and 2000s, which includes three FIFA World Cups (11 appearances in 1998, 2002 and 2006) and three UEFA European Championships (5 appearances in 1996, 2004 and 2008).

Club career

Dinamo Zagreb
Šimić joined Dinamo Zagreb in 1987 at the age of twelve and rose through the ranks of their youth academy before being promoted to the senior squad for the 1992–93 season. His debut for the Blues came under manager Miroslav Blažević in the first match of the season, a Prva HNL away game against Varteks on 23 August 1992, which made him the youngest ever player to debut for the club as Šimić was only three months shy from his 17th birthday. He continued to make five more appearances in his first top-flight season and although was widely regarded as a promising player, he struggled to make a bigger impact in his first season with the squad which eventually won the Croatian title that year.

However, right from the beginning of the 1993–94 season he established himself as a first team regular and was one of the key players of the squad in one of the most successful periods in club's history. In the next six seasons Šimić helped the club win another four titles as well as four Croatian Cups. In this period Šimić also experienced his first taste of European football when Dinamo (known as Croatia Zagreb from 1992 to 2000) played Auxerre in a 1994–95 Cup Winners' Cup first round tie as he appeared a 3–1 home win at Maksimir on 29 September 1994. He regularly appeared in all of the club's European campaigns over the following four seasons and took part in some of the club's biggest achievements in recent times, such as reaching the 1997–98 UEFA Cup round of 16 (where they were knocked out by Atlético Madrid 2–1 on aggregate) and group stage of the 1998–99 Champions League (after knocking out Celtic 3–1 on aggregate in the second qualifying round).

Other notable Dinamo players and Šimić's teammates from that era were Silvio Marić, Dražen Ladić, Igor Cvitanović, Mark Viduka and Robert Prosinečki, as well as Krunoslav Jurčić and Goran Jurić with whom he formed a solid defensive partnership. In his six and a half years with the club, Šimić earned a total of 140 league appearances and scored 14 goals.

In the meantime Šimić's former coach at Dinamo, Miroslav Blažević, was appointed Croatia manager in 1994. In 1996, impressed by his string of good performances, Blažević called him up and, after playing 16 games for Croatia's youth teams, Šimić earned his first full international cap on 13 March 1996 in a friendly against South Korea, coming on as a substitute for Igor Štimac. Šimić quickly became a first team regular in the national team under Blažević, and went on to play in six 1998 FIFA World Cup qualifiers, as well as six matches at the final tournament itself in France, where Croatia eventually won third place.

Internazionale
His good performances at the 1998 World Cup and in the 1998–99 Champions League attracted attention from some of Europe's biggest clubs and he went on to join Internazionale in January 1999 for a fee of 11 million euros, which was at the time Dinamo's all-time transfer record (and to this day surpassed only by outgoing transfers of Vedran Ćorluka and Eduardo in 2007 and Luka Modrić in 2008).

Under coach Marcello Lippi, Šimić had his Serie A debut in a 2–0 win against Venezia at San Siro on 10 January 1999. By the end of his first season in Italy, Šimić earned a total of 17 appearances and scored 2 goals for Internazionale. In the following couple of seasons Šimić's services were regularly used, until the 2001–02 season, when he had only 12 league and 8 European appearances.  and in June 2002 Internazionale and their cross-city rivals AC Milan agreed a player swap with Ümit Davala going in the opposite direction, which Šimić was valued €16.5 million, despite it was purely accounting purpose. In his three and a half years with Internazionale he earned a total of 66 league appearances and scored 3 goals. The club failed to win any silverware in this period, and their highest finish was fourth place in the 1999–2000 season, even though this was the time when some of football's biggest stars played there with Šimić, such as Roberto Baggio, Ronaldo, Ivan Zamorano, Diego Simeone and Christian Vieri.

Milan
At A.C. Milan, Šimić was immediately made a member of the first-team squad under Carlo Ancelotti, who changed Šimić's playing position from centre back to right back in a four-men defensive line. His debut for AC Milan came in a 2002–03 Champions League third qualifying round away game against Slovan Liberec on 28 August 2002. Šimić went on to make 12 appearances for AC Milan in their run to the UEFA Champions League title in 2003, though he was omitted from both semi-final legs against Inter and the final match against Serie A rivals Juventus at Old Trafford. He made 29 Serie A appearances for AC Milan in his first season with the club, but in the following three seasons he never regained his place as a first-team regular, making only 27 league appearances over the three seasons. In May 2006, he signed a contract extension until 2009 with AC Milan, just weeks after openly criticising coach Carlo Ancelotti over lack of playing time.

He was more or less able to regain his place as a regular with AC Milan in the Serie A in 2006–07, making 22 league appearances that season. However, his opportunities in the UEFA Champions League, won again by AC Milan that season, were limited as he only made six appearances (including two in the qualifying rounds) until the round of 16. The 2007–08 season saw him making only four Serie A appearances for the club. In his only UEFA Champions League appearance that season, against Celtic, he was member of the starting eleven but was forced to leave the pitch due to an injury after spending less than 30 minutes in the game.

Monaco
In August 2008, Šimić moved to AS Monaco. He made his Ligue 1 debut on 23 August 2008 in Monaco's 1–1 draw at home to SM Caen, playing the entire match and assisting Frédéric Nimani for the opening goal. He went on to establish himself as a regular at the club, making a total of 26 league appearances before being sent off against Le Havre in April 2009. He lost his place as a regular in the team after that, making no appearances since Monaco's final league match of the 2008–09 season, a goalless draw at Paris Saint-Germain.

Dinamo Zagreb
On 27 April 2010, Šimić returned to Dinamo Zagreb on a free transfer after having spent 11 years playing abroad. However, Šimić went on to announce his retirement from active football only three months later on 10 August 2010. During the short spell Šimić appeared in 3 competitive matches for the Blues, including the 2010 Croatian Supercup, and two European away matches against Koper and Sheriff Tiraspol, without ever appearing in the 2010–11 Prva HNL. In his announcement, Šimić said that he enrolled at the coaching academy and confirmed that his future plans involved staying in football, possibly as a manager.

International career
Between 1993 and 1996, Šimić won a total of 17 international caps for the Croatian under-19 and under-21 national teams, scoring one goal for the under-21 team. He made his senior international debut on 13 March 1996 in a friendly match against the Korea Republic, coming on as a substitute for Igor Štimac in the final 20 minutes.

Šimić only made one appearance for Croatia at the UEFA Euro 1996 finals in England. However, he established himself as a regular at the 1998 FIFA World Cup finals in France, where he appeared in six of Croatia's seven matches in their run to a third-place finish, only missing the third-place match with a yellow-card suspension.

He made two appearances for Croatia at the 2002 FIFA World Cup finals and also featured in all of their three group matches at the UEFA Euro 2004 finals. Both these tournaments saw Croatia being eliminated in the group stage, just like the 2006 FIFA World Cup finals, where he appeared in all of Croatia's three matches. Winning his 82nd international cap in the team's second match at the latter tournament, against Japan on 18 June 2006 in Nuremberg, he dislodged Robert Jarni (81 caps) as the Croatian national team's all-time cap leader. In the final group match, a 2–2 draw against Australia, he was sent off five minutes from time after receiving his second yellow card.

Šimić also scored three goals for Croatia, with his final international goal coming in a friendly match against Argentina on 1 March 2006 in Basel, where he netted a last-minute goal to give Croatia a 3–2 victory. Alongside experienced Robert Kovač and Igor Tudor, he is considered one of the best Croatian defenders in recent history.

100th cap and retirement
Šimić came very close to completing the fairy tale and winning his 100th cap for Croatia at the finals of the UEFA Euro 2008. However, he missed the first two games of the tournament, unable to dislodge Vedran Ćorluka, Robert Kovač or Josip Šimunić from their berths in the first team. With a place in the quarter-finals secured after the first two games, Croatia coach Slaven Bilić gave many of his second-string players a chance to play in the final group match against Poland, with Šimić starting the match and captaining the side on the occasion of his 99th cap. Croatia went on to win the match 1–0, finishing the group stage with 3 wins in 3 matches. However, he was once again left an unused substitute in the quarter-finals against Turkey, which Croatia lost in penalty shootout.

On 20 August 2008, Šimić finally won his 100th international cap in a friendly match against Slovenia in Maribor, becoming the first Croatian player to win 100 international caps. He started the match and captained the team in the first half, before being replaced by debutant Ivica Križanac at half-time. Croatia won the match 3–2.

Šimić was subsequently also called up for Croatia's opening two qualifiers for the 2010 FIFA World Cup in early September 2008, at home to Kazakhstan and England, being an unused substitute in the former and completely left out of the latter. Following the 4–1 defeat to England, Croatia's first competitive defeat at home, rumours about Šimić being set to retire from international football appeared in the Croatian media. On 16 September 2008, it was eventually confirmed that Šimić has announced his retirement from international football after being a Croatian international for  years.

Personal life
Šimić is a devout Catholic and organizes pilgrimages. He is the owner of Aquaviva company. He married Jelena Medić in 2000 with whom he has sons Roko, Viktor, Nikolas and David, the latter of whom has Down syndrome.
He is the older brother of Josip Šimić and a distant relative of Herzegovinian hajduk Andrijica Šimić.

Career statistics

Club

1 Played in Croatian Cup and Croatian Super Cup with Dinamo Zagreb.
2 Played in UEFA Champions League, UEFA Super Cup and UEFA Cup with Croatia Zagreb, Internazionale Milano and Milan.

International
Source:

International goals

Honours

Club
Dinamo Zagreb
 Croatian First League: 1992–93, 1995–96, 1996–97, 1997–98
 Croatian Football Cup: 1993–94, 1995–96, 1996–97, 1997–98
 Croatian Super Cup: 2010

Milan
 Serie A: 2003–04
 Coppa Italia: 2002–03
 UEFA Champions League: 2002–03, 2006–07
 UEFA Super Cup: 2003
 FIFA Club World Cup: 2007

International
Croatia
 FIFA World Cup Third place – Bronze medal: 1998

Individual
 Croatian Football Hope of the Year: 1995
UEFA awards 100 caps: 2011

Orders
 Order of the Croatian Interlace – 1998

See also
List of footballers with 100 or more caps

References

External links

1975 births
Living people
Croatian footballers
Croatia international footballers
Croatia under-21 international footballers
Croatia youth international footballers
Croatian expatriate footballers
Inter Milan players
A.C. Milan players
GNK Dinamo Zagreb players
AS Monaco FC players
UEFA Euro 1996 players
1998 FIFA World Cup players
2002 FIFA World Cup players
UEFA Euro 2004 players
2006 FIFA World Cup players
UEFA Euro 2008 players
Serie A players
Expatriate footballers in Italy
Expatriate footballers in Monaco
Footballers from Zagreb
Croatian Football League players
Ligue 1 players
FIFA Century Club
Association football defenders
UEFA Champions League winning players